The Mogollon Rim ( or  or ) is a topographical and geological feature cutting across the northern half of the U.S. state of Arizona. It forms the southern edge of the Colorado Plateau in Arizona.

Description

The Rim is an escarpment defining the southwestern edge of the Colorado Plateau. Its central and most spectacular portions are characterized by high cliffs of limestone and sandstone, namely the Kaibab Limestone and Coconino Sandstone cliffs. The escarpment was created by erosion and faulting,  cutting dramatic canyons into it, including Fossil Creek Canyon and Pine Canyon. The name Mogollon comes from Don Juan Ignacio Flores Mogollón, the Spanish Governor of New Mexico from 1712 to 1715.

Extensive Ponderosa pine forests are found both on the slopes of the Rim and on the plateau north of it. The Mogollon Rim is a major floristic and faunal boundary, with species characteristic of the Rocky Mountains living on the top of the plateau, and species native to the Mexican Sierra Madre Occidental on the slopes below and in the Madrean Sky Islands (high, isolated mountain ranges) further south.

The Mogollon Rim's limestones and sandstones were formed from sediments deposited in the Carboniferous and Permian Periods. Several of the Rim's rock formations are also seen on the walls of the Grand Canyon. In many places, the Rim is capped or even buried by the extensive basaltic lava flows.

The uppermost sandstone stratum of the Mogollon Rim, called the Coconino Sandstone, forms spectacular white cliffs, sometimes several hundred feet high. This formation of the Permian Period is of aeolian (windblown) origin and is one of the thickest sand-dune-derived sandstones on earth.

Cities and towns near the Mogollon Rim include Payson, Sedona, Show Low, Alpine and Pinetop-Lakeside. The Mogollon Rim is practically bisected by Interstate 17 which runs north-to-south between Flagstaff and Phoenix.

In June 2002, the eastern portion of the Mogollon Rim was the site of Arizona's second-largest wildfire, the  Rodeo–Chediski Fire. The Mogollon Rim was also the site of the Dude fire that started on June 25, 1990. Other large fires have burned along the Mogollon Rim since 1990, and the area's Ponderosa pine forests remain vulnerable because of past fire-suppression efforts and the buildup of available dry fuel.

Western novel author Zane Grey built a hunting cabin on the slopes of the Mogollon Rim just northeast of Payson, above Tonto Creek. The cabin was restored by the Phoenix air-conditioning magnate William Goettl during the late 1960s, but it was destroyed by the Dude Fire in 1990.

Louis L'Amour's novel The Sackett Brand, set near the Mogollon Rim, includes descriptions of its cliffs.

See also 
 Hellsgate Wilderness
 Mogollon Monster
 Mogollon Mountains
 Pinyon-juniper woodland

References

External links

 Mogollon Rim  recreation, Coconino National Forest
 Land Use History of the Mogollon Rim, Arizona

 
Escarpments of the United States
Colorado Plateau
Regions of Arizona
Regions of the Western United States
Landforms of Yavapai County, Arizona